Ceol is an Irish compilation album series released annually between 2005 and 2018. Published as part of Seachtain na Gaeilge, the albums contain works in the Irish language by various Irish artists.

Releases

Ceol '06

Ceol 06 is a 26-track double album of songs in Irish, released in March 2006 to celebrate Seachtain na Gaeilge. It includes contributions from acts such as The Corrs and The Frames. The songs – many of them written in Irish, others translated from English – include Mundy's reinvention of his hit, "Mexico". All acts gave their time free of charge, with profits going to the charity Concern.

CD 1

CD 2

Ceol '07

Ceol '07 is a double album of songs in Irish, including contributions by Bell X1, Mundy, The Corrs, as Fiach and Claire Sproule. Profits for the albums sale went to Concern. The track listing included:

Ceol '08

Ceol '08 was a 17-track album which featured contributions by established acts such as the Delorentos, Mundy and the Coronas, alongside newer performers such as Luan Parle. Many of the songs are written in Irish; others are translated from English. All acts gave their time free of charge, with profits going to the charity Concern. The track listing included:

Ceol '09 

The 2009 release, titled Ceol '09, included songs by The Swell Season, Eddi Reader, Mick Flannery, Cathy Davey, Duke Special, Paddy Casey and Ham Sandwich. The first track, Grá Dom Leonadh, is a rerecording by Glen Hansard and Markéta Irglová of their 2007 Oscar-winning song Falling Slowly. The proceeds from sales of the album went to the children's charity Barnardo's. The track listing includes:

Ceol '10

Ceol '10 was released during Seachtain na Gaeilge in March 2010. The album features songs in Irish by The Coronas, Bell X1, Gemma Hayes, Luan Parle, Mundy, The Saw Doctors, Kíla, Eddi Reader and The Swell Season. The album reached #3 in the Irish Compilation Album charts. All proceeds from sales of the CD went to the children's charity Barnardo's. The track listing includes:

References 

Charity albums
Irish-language albums
2006 compilation albums
2007 compilation albums
2008 compilation albums
2009 compilation albums
2010 compilation albums